Owain Arwel Hughes CBE (born 21 March 1942) is a Welsh orchestral conductor.

Hughes was born in Ton Pentre, Rhondda, the son of the composer Arwel Hughes. He studied at Howardian High School, Cardiff, University College, Cardiff and the Royal College of Music.  He studied conducting under Sir Adrian Boult, Bernard Haitink and Rudolf Kempe.
According to The Oxford Dictionary of Music, Hughes's professional career began in 1968, since then his guest conductorships have included engagements with Welsh National Opera and the English National Opera, and his musical directorships have included the National Eisteddfod of Wales (1977) and the Huddersfield Choral Society (1980–1986).

Appointments
Hughes's other former and current appointments include:
Philharmonia Orchestra, London, associate conductor
Royal Philharmonic Orchestra, London, principal associate conductor
BBC Welsh Orchestra (now the BBC National Orchestra of Wales), associate conductor (1980–1986)
Aalborg Symphony Orchestra, Denmark, principal conductor (1994–1999)
Cape Town Philharmonic Orchestra, South Africa, principal guest conductor
National Youth Orchestra of Wales, musical director (2003–2010)
Camerata Wales, founder and musical director (2005–)
Welsh Proms, founder and artistic director (1986–)
University of Wales, Trinity Saint David, professor of performance (1986–)

Publication
 Autobiography

Awards and honours
 OBE (2004)
 CBE (2009)
Honorary DMus, University of Wales (1991)
Honorary Fellow, Bangor University (2007)
Honorary Fellow, University of Wales, Lampeter (2007)

References

External links
Owain Arwel Hughes - official website
Welsh Proms - official website
World Concert Artist Directory - Owain Arwel Hughes

1942 births
Living people
Alumni of the Royal College of Music
Alumni of Cardiff University
Commanders of the Order of the British Empire
Welsh conductors (music)
British male conductors (music)
21st-century British conductors (music)
21st-century British male musicians
21st-century Welsh musicians
20th-century British conductors (music)
20th-century British male musicians
20th-century Welsh musicians